Accolades received by Frozen may refer to:

 Accolades received by Frozen (1997 film)
 Accolades received by Frozen (2005 film)
 Accolades received by Frozen (2007 film)
 Accolades received by Frozen (2010 American film)
 Accolades received by Frozen (2013 film)

See also
 Frozen (disambiguation)